Světec is a municipality and village in Teplice District in the Ústí nad Labem Region of the Czech Republic. It has about 1,000 inhabitants.

Administrative parts
Villages of Chotějovice, Štrbice and Úpoř are administrative parts of Světec.

Notable people
Vojtěch Preissig (1873–1944), painter and illustrator

References

Villages in Teplice District